Rear Admiral Harold Bruce Farncomb  (28 February 1899 – 12 February 1971) was a senior officer in the Royal Australian Navy (RAN) who served in the First and Second World Wars, and as a lawyer. He was the first Australian-born RAN officer to reach a flag rank in the RAN. The Collins class submarine  is named in his honour.

Early life
Harold Farncomb was born in North Sydney, New South Wales on 28 February 1899, the second child of Frank Farncomb and Helen Louisa Farncomb, née Sampson. The family lived in Gordon on the north shore of Sydney. He attended Gordon Public School and Sydney Boys' High School before entering the Royal Australian Naval College (RANC) at age 13 in the RANC's first intake. Farncomb excelled academically at the RANC, graduating with very impressive scores and topped his final year (1916). On completing his studies at the RANC he was promoted to midshipman on 1 January 1917 and left immediately on the steamer Naldera for training with the Royal Navy. Farncomb was stationed on board the battleship  in April 1917.

Naval career

After completing training at Whale Island Farncomb was transferred to Woolsher, a small craft attached to the destroyer force at the Firth of Forth. He then received his first posting in Australia; stationed on board  for a year as a gunnery officer, this posting was followed by a year on the staff of Commodore Percy Addison, Commodore Commanding the Australia Squadron (CCAS). In May 1925, after a 10-month war staff course in the United Kingdom, he took a posting as a staff officer (operations) with the CCAS.

Naval career summary

Post-military life

Farncomb left the service in 1951 and learned Latin to enable him to study for the Barristers' Admission Board examinations. Admitted to the Bar on 6 June 1958, he developed a reasonably busy practice in Sydney and subsequently joined the solicitors, Alfred Rofe & Sons.
A street in the town of Narooma is named in Farncomb's honour.

Heart disease eventually led to his retirement.

Personal life
On 31 March 1927 at Trinity Congregational Church, Strathfield, Sydney, he married Jean Ross Nott; they were to remain childless. "Jean provided staunch support throughout the vicissitudes of her husband's career".

Retirement and death
Survived by his wife, Farncomb died of heart failure on 12 February 1971 in St Vincent's Hospital, Darlinghurst, and was cremated with Anglican rites. His ashes were scattered at sea on 2 March from the flight deck of his last flagship, off the coast of Western Australia.

References

External links

1956 portrait of RAdm Farncomb by Harold Abbott

1899 births
1971 deaths
Australian military personnel of World War I
Australian Companions of the Distinguished Service Order
Australian Companions of the Order of the Bath
Australian Members of the Royal Victorian Order
Commanders of the Legion of Merit
Graduates of the Royal Australian Naval College
People from New South Wales
Recipients of the Navy Cross (United States)
Royal Australian Navy admirals
Royal Australian Navy personnel of World War II